Eldorado is an unincorporated community and census-designated place (CDP) in Blair County, Pennsylvania, United States. It was first listed as a CDP prior to the 2020 census.

The CDP is in western Blair County, along the southern border of Logan Township. It is bordered to the south by Allegheny Township and to the east by the Eldorado neighborhood in the city of Altoona.

Demographics

References 

Census-designated places in Blair County, Pennsylvania
Census-designated places in Pennsylvania